Milton Rehnquist (April 3, 1892 – December 1971) was an American football offensive lineman in the National Football League for the Kansas City Blues, Cleveland Bulldogs, Kansas City Cowboys, Providence Steam Roller, New York Giants, and the Boston Braves.  He attended Bethany College. 

1892 births
1971 deaths
American football offensive linemen
Kansas City Blues (NFL) players
Cleveland Bulldogs players
Kansas City Cowboys (NFL) players
Providence Steam Roller players
New York Giants players
Boston Braves (NFL) players
Players of American football from Minnesota